Trazodone, sold under many brand names, is an antidepressant medication. It is used to treat major depressive disorder, anxiety disorders, and difficulties with sleep. The medication is taken orally.

Common side-effects include dry mouth, feeling faint, vomiting, and headache. More serious side effects may include suicide, mania, irregular heart rate, and pathologically prolonged erections. It is unclear if use during pregnancy or breastfeeding is safe. It is a phenylpiperazine compound of the serotonin antagonist and reuptake inhibitor (SARI) class. Trazodone also has sedating effects.

Trazodone was approved for medical use in the United States in 1981. It is available as a generic medication. In 2020, it was the 21st most commonly prescribed medication in the United States, with more than 26million prescriptions.

Medical uses

Depression
The primary use of trazodone is the treatment of unipolar major depression with or without anxiety. Data from open and double-blind trials suggest the antidepressant efficacy of trazodone is comparable to that of amitriptyline, doxepin, and mianserin. Also, trazodone showed anxiolytic properties, low cardiotoxicity, and relatively mild side effects.

Because trazodone has minimal anticholinergic activity, it was especially welcomed as a treatment for geriatric patients with depression when it first became available. Three double-blind studies reported trazodone has antidepressant efficacy similar to that of other antidepressants in geriatric patients. However, a side effect of trazodone, orthostatic hypotension, which may cause dizziness and increase the risk of falling, can have devastating consequences for elderly patients; thus, this side effect, along with sedation, often makes trazodone less acceptable for this population, compared with newer compounds that share its lack of anticholinergic activity but not the rest of its side-effect profile. Still, trazodone is often helpful for geriatric patients with depression who have severe agitation and insomnia.

Trazodone is usually used at a dosage of 150 to 300mg/day for the treatment of depression. Lower doses have also been used to augment other antidepressants, or when initiating therapy. Higher doses up to 600mg/day have been used in more severe cases of depression, for instance in hospitalized patients. Trazodone is usually administered multiple times per day, but once-daily administration may be similarly effective.

Anxiety disorders
Trazodone is often used in the treatment of anxiety disorders such as generalized anxiety disorder, panic disorder, post-traumatic stress disorder (PTSD), and obsessive–compulsive disorder (OCD). However, use of trazodone in anxiety disorders is off-label and evidence of its effectiveness for these indications is variable and limited. Benefits for OCD appear to be mild. Besides anxiety, trazodone has been used to treat sleep disturbances and nightmares in PTSD. Trazodone is often used as an alternative to benzodiazepines in the treatment of anxiety disorders.

Insomnia
Low-dose trazodone is used off-label in the treatment of insomnia and is considered to be effective and safe for this indication. It may also be used to treat antidepressant-related insomnia. Trazodone was the second-most prescribed agent for insomnia in the early 2000s, though most studies of trazodone for treatment of sleep disturbances have been in depressed individuals.

Systematic reviews and meta-analyses published in the late 2010s, including a Cochrane review, found low-dose trazodone to be an effective medication for short-term treatment of insomnia both in depressed and non-depressed people. Trazodone slightly improves subjective sleep quality ( = –0.34 to –0.41) and reduces number of nighttime awakenings ( = –0.31,  = –0.51). Conversely, it does not appear to affect sleep onset, total sleep time, time awake after sleep onset, or sleep efficiency. It appears to increase deep sleep, in contrast to certain other hypnotics. The quality of evidence of trazodone for short-term treatment of insomnia was rated as low to moderate. There is no evidence available at present to inform long-term use of trazodone in the treatment of insomnia.

The benefits of trazodone for insomnia must be weighed against potential adverse effects such as morning grogginess, daytime sleepiness, cognitive and motor impairment, and postural hypotension, among others. Quality safety data on use of trazodone as a sleep aid are currently lacking.

Trazodone is used at low doses in the range of 25 to 150mg/day for insomnia. Higher doses of 200 to 600mg/day have also been studied.

The American Academy of Sleep Medicine's 2017 clinical practice guidelines recommended against the use of trazodone in the treatment of insomnia due to inadequate evidence and due to harms potentially outweighing benefits.

Combination with other antidepressants
Trazodone is often used in combination with other antidepressants such as selective serotonin reuptake inhibitors in order to augment their antidepressant and anxiolytic effects and to reduce side effects such as sexual dysfunction, anxiety, and insomnia.

Available forms
Trazodone is provided as the hydrochloride salt and is available in the form of 50mg, 100mg, 150mg, and 300mg oral tablets.

An extended-release oral tablet formulation at doses of 150mg and 300mg is also available.

Side effects

Because of its lack of anticholinergic side effects, trazodone is especially useful in situations in which antimuscarinic effects are particularly problematic (e.g., in patients with benign prostatic hyperplasia, closed-angle glaucoma, or severe constipation). Trazodone's propensity to cause sedation is a dual-edged sword. For many patients, the relief from agitation, anxiety, and insomnia can be rapid; for other patients, including those individuals with considerable psychomotor retardation and feelings of low energy, therapeutic doses of trazodone may not be tolerable because of sedation. Trazodone elicits orthostatic hypotension in some people, probably as a consequence of α1-adrenergic receptor blockade. The unmasking of bipolar disorder may occur with trazodone and other antidepressants.

Precautions for trazodone include known hypersensitivity to trazodone and under 18 years and combined with other antidepressant medications, it may increase the possibility of suicidal thoughts or actions.

While trazodone is not a true member of the SSRI class of antidepressants, it does still share many properties of SSRIs, especially the possibility of discontinuation syndrome if the medication is stopped too quickly. Care must, therefore, be taken when coming off the medication, usually by a gradual process of tapering down the dose over a period of time.

Suicide
Antidepressants may increase the risk of suicidal thoughts and behaviors in children and young adults. Close monitoring for emergence of suicidal thoughts and behaviors is thus recommended.

Sedation
Since trazodone may impair the mental and/or physical abilities required for performance of potentially hazardous tasks, such as operating an automobile or machinery, the patient should be cautioned not to engage in such activities while impaired. Compared to the reversible MAOI antidepressant drug moclobemide, more impairment of vigilance occurs with trazodone. Trazodone has been found to impair driving ability.

Cardiac
Case reports have noted cardiac arrhythmias emerging in relation to trazodone treatment, both in patients with pre-existing mitral valve prolapse and in patients with negative personal and family histories of cardiac disease.

QT prolongation has been reported with trazodone therapy. Arrhythmia identified include isolated PVCs, ventricular couplets, and in two patients short episodes (three to four beats) of ventricular tachycardia. Several post-marketing reports have been made of arrhythmia in trazodone-treated patients who have pre-existing cardiac disease and in some patients who did not have pre-existing cardiac disease. Until the results of prospective studies are available, patients with pre-existing cardiac disease should be closely monitored, particularly for cardiac arrhythmias. Trazodone is not recommended for use during the initial recovery phase of myocardial infarction. Concomitant administration of drugs that prolong the QT interval or that are inhibitors of CYP3A4 may increase the risk of cardiac arrhythmia.

Priapism
A relatively rare side effect associated with trazodone is priapism, likely due to its antagonism at α-adrenergic receptors. More than 200 cases have been reported, and the manufacturer estimated that the incidence of any abnormal erectile function is about one in 6,000 male patients treated with trazodone. The risk for this side effect appears to be greatest during the first month of treatment at low dosages (i.e. <150mg/day). Early recognition of any abnormal erectile function is important, including prolonged or inappropriate erections, and should prompt discontinuation of trazodone treatment. Spontaneous orgasms have also been reported with trazodone in men.

Clinical reports have described trazodone-associated psychosexual side effects in women as well, including increased libido, priapism of the clitoris, and spontaneous orgasms.

Others
Rare cases of liver toxicity have been observed, possibly due to the formation of reactive metabolites.

Elevated prolactin concentrations have been observed in people taking trazodone. They appear to be increased by around 1.5- to 2-fold.

Studies on trazodone and cognitive function are mixed, with some finding improvement, others finding no change, and some finding impairment.

Trazodone does not seem to worsen periodic limb movements during sleep.

Trazodone is associated with increased risk of falls in older adults. It has also been associated with increased risk of hip fractures in older adults.

Pregnancy and lactation
Sufficient data in humans are lacking. Use should be justified by the severity of the condition to be treated.

Overdose
There are reported cases of high doses of trazodone precipitating serotonin syndrome. There are also reports of patients taking multiple SSRIs with trazodone and precipitating serotonin syndrome.

Trazodone appears to be relatively safer than TCAs, MAOIs, and a few of the other second-generation antidepressants in overdose situations, especially when it is the only agent taken. Fatalities are rare, and uneventful recoveries have been reported after ingestion of doses as high as 6,000–9,200mg. In one report, 9 of 294 cases of overdose were fatal, and all nine patients had also taken other central nervous system (CNS) depressants. When trazodone overdoses occur, clinicians should carefully monitor for low blood pressure, a potentially serious toxic effect. In a report of a fatal trazodone overdose, torsades de pointes and complete atrioventricular block developed, along with subsequent multiple organ failure, with a trazodone plasma concentration of 25.4mg/L on admission.

Interactions
Trazodone is metabolized by several liver enzymes, including CYP3A4, CYP2D6, and CYP1A2. Its active metabolite meta-chlorophenylpiperazine (mCPP) is known to be formed by CYP3A4 and metabolized by CYP2D6. Inhibition or induction of the aforementioned enzymes by various other substances may alter the metabolism of trazodone and/or mCPP, leading to increased and/or decreased blood concentrations. The enzymes in question are known to be inhibited and induced by many medications, herbs, and foods, and as such, trazodone may interact with these substances. Potent CYP3A4 inhibitors such as clarithromycin, erythromycin, fluvoxamine, grapefruit juice, ketoconazole, and ritonavir may lead to increased concentrations of trazodone and decreased concentrations of mCPP, while CYP3A4 inducers like carbamazepine, enzalutamide, phenytoin, phenobarbital, and St. John's wort may result in decreased trazodone concentrations and increased mCPP concentrations. CYP2D6 inhibitors may result in increased concentrations of both trazodone and mCPP while CYP2D6 inducers may decrease their concentrations. Examples of potent CYP2D6 inhibitors include bupropion, cannabidiol, duloxetine, fluoxetine, paroxetine, quinidine, and ritonavir, while CYP2D6 inducers include dexamethasone, glutethimide, and haloperidol. CYP1A2 inhibitors may increase trazodone concentrations while CYP1A2 inducers may decrease trazodone concentrations. Examples of potent CYP1A2 inhibitors include ethinylestradiol (found in hormonal birth control), fluoroquinolones (e.g., ciprofloxacin), fluvoxamine, and St. John's wort, while potent CYP1A2 inducers include phenytoin, rifampin, ritonavir, and tobacco.

A study found that ritonavir, a strong CYP3A4 and CYP2D6 inhibitor and moderate CYP1A2 inducer, increased trazodone peak levels by 1.34-fold, increased area-under-the-curve levels by 2.4-fold, and decreased the clearance of trazodone by 50%. This was associated with adverse effects such as nausea, hypotension, and syncope. Another study found that the strong CYP3A4 inducer carbamazepine reduced concentrations of trazodone by 60 to 74%. The strong CYP2D6 inhibitor thioridazine has been reported to increase concentrations of trazodone by 1.36-fold and concentrations of mCPP by 1.54-fold. On the other hand, CYP2D6 genotype has not been found to predict trazodone or mCPP concentrations with trazodone therapy, although it did correlate with side effects like dizziness and prolonged corrected QT interval.

Combination of trazodone with selective serotonin reuptake inhibitors (SSRIs), tricyclic antidepressants (TCAs), or monoamine oxidase inhibitors has a theoretical risk of serotonin syndrome. However, trazodone has been studied in combination with SSRIs and seemed to be safe in this context. On the other hand, cases of excessive sedation and serotonin syndrome have been reported with the combinations of trazodone and fluoxetine or paroxetine. This may be due to combined potentiation of the serotonin system. However, it may also be related to the fact that fluoxetine and paroxetine are strong inhibitors of CYP2D6 and fluoxetine is additionally a weak or moderate inhibitor of CYP3A4. Accordingly, fluoxetine has been reported to result in increased levels of trazodone and mCPP by 1.31- to 1.65-fold and by 2.97- to 3.39-fold, respectively.

Smokers have lower levels of trazodone and higher ratios of mCPP to trazodone. Trazodone levels were 30% lower in smokers and mCPP to trazodone ratio was 1.29-fold higher in smokers, whereas mCPP concentrations were not different between smokers and non-smokers. Smoking is known to induce CYP1A2, and this may be involved in these findings.

Pharmacology

Pharmacodynamics

Trazodone is a mixed agonist and antagonist of various serotonin receptors, antagonist of adrenergic receptors, weak histamine H1 receptor antagonist, and weak serotonin reuptake inhibitor. More specifically, it is an antagonist of 5-HT2A and 5-HT2B receptors, a partial agonist of the 5-HT1A receptor, and an antagonist of the α1- and α2-adrenergic receptors. It is also a ligand of the 5-HT2C receptor with lower affinity than for the 5-HT2A receptor. However, it is unknown whether trazodone acts as a full agonist, partial agonist, or antagonist of the 5-HT2C receptor. Trazodone is a 5-HT1A receptor partial agonist similarly to buspirone and tandospirone but with comparatively greater intrinsic activity. A range of weak affinities (Ki) have been reported for trazodone at the human histamine H1 receptor, including 220nM, 350nM, 500nM, and 1,100nM.

Trazodone has a minor active metabolite known as meta-chlorophenylpiperazine (mCPP), and this metabolite may contribute to some degree to the pharmacological properties of trazodone. In contrast to trazodone, mCPP is an agonist of various serotonin receptors. It has relatively low affinity for α1-adrenergic receptors unlike trazodone, but does high affinity for α2-adrenergic receptors and weak affinity for the H1 receptor. In addition to direct interactions with serotonin receptors, mCPP is a serotonin releasing agent similarly to agents like fenfluramine and MDMA. In contrast to these serotonin releasing agents however, mCPP does not appear to cause long-term serotonin depletion (a property thought to be related to serotonergic neurotoxicity).

Trazodone's 5-HT2A receptor antagonism and weak serotonin reuptake inhibition form the basis of its common label as an antidepressant of the serotonin antagonist and reuptake inhibitor (SARI) type.

Target occupancy studies
Studies have estimated occupancy of target sites by trazodone based on trazodone concentrations in blood and brain and on the affinities of trazodone for the human targets in question. Roughly half of brain 5-HT2A receptors are blocked by 1mg of trazodone and essentially all 5-HT2A receptors are saturated at 10mg of trazodone, but the clinically effective hypnotic doses of trazodone are in the 25–100mg range. The occupancy of the serotonin transporter (SERT) by trazodone is estimated to be 86% at 100mg/day and 90% at 150mg/day. Trazodone may almost completely occupy the 5-HT2A and 5-HT2C receptors at doses of 100 to 150mg/day. Significant occupancy of a number of other sites may also occur. However, another study estimated much lower occupancy of the SERT and 5-HT2A receptors by trazodone.

Correspondence to clinical effects

Trazodone may act predominantly as a 5-HT2A receptor antagonist to mediate its therapeutic benefits against anxiety and depression. Its inhibitory effects on serotonin reuptake and 5-HT2C receptors are comparatively weak. In relation to these properties, trazodone does not have similar properties to selective serotonin reuptake inhibitors (SSRIs) and is not particularly associated with increased appetite and weight gain—unlike other 5-HT2C antagonists like mirtazapine. Moderate 5-HT1A partial agonism may contribute to trazodone's antidepressant and anxiolytic actions to some extent as well.

The combined actions of 5-HT2A and 5HT2C receptor antagonism with serotonin reuptake inhibition only occur at moderate to high doses of trazodone. Doses of trazodone lower than those effective for antidepressant action are frequently used for the effective treatment of insomnia. Low doses exploit trazodone's potent actions as a 5-HT2A receptor antagonist, and its properties as an antagonist of H1 and α1-adrenergic receptors, but do not adequately exploit its SERT or 5-HT2C inhibition properties, which are weaker. Since insomnia is one of the most frequent residual symptoms of depression after treatment with an SSRI, a hypnotic is often necessary for patients with a major depressive episode. Not only can a hypnotic potentially relieve the insomnia itself, but treating insomnia in patients with major depression may also increase remission rates due to improvement of other symptoms such as loss of energy and depressed mood. Thus, the ability of low doses of trazodone to improve sleep in depressed patients may be an important mechanism whereby trazodone can augment the efficacy of other antidepressants.

Trazodone's potent α1-adrenergic blockade may cause some side effects like orthostatic hypotension and sedation. Conversely, along with 5-HT2A and H1 receptor antagonism, it may contribute to its efficacy as a hypnotic. Trazodone lacks any affinity for the muscarinic acetylcholine receptors, so does not produce anticholinergic side effects.

mCPP, a non-selective serotonin receptor modulator and serotonin releasing agent, is an active metabolite of trazodone and has been suggested to possibly play a role in its therapeutic benefits. However, research has not supported this hypothesis and mCPP might actually antagonize the efficacy of trazodone as well as produce additional side effects.

Pharmacokinetics

Absorption
Trazodone is well-absorbed after oral administration. Its bioavailability is 65 to 80%. Peak blood levels of trazodone occur 1 to 2hours after ingestion and peak levels of the metabolite mCPP occur after 2 to 4hours. Absorption is somewhat delayed and enhanced by food.

Distribution
Trazodone is not sequestered into any tissue. The medication is 89 to 95% protein-bound. The volume of distribution of trazodone is 0.8 to 1.5L/kg. Trazodone is highly lipophilic.

Metabolism
The metabolic pathways involved in the metabolism are not well-characterized. In any case, the cytochrome P450 enzymes CYP3A4, CYP2D6, and CYP1A2 may all be involved to varying extents. Trazodone is known to be extensively metabolized by the liver via hydroxylation, N-oxidation, and N-dealkylation. Several metabolites of trazodone have been identified, including a dihydrodiol metabolite (via hydroxylation), a metabolite hydroxylated at the para position of the meta-chlorophenyl ring (via CYP2D6), oxotriazolepyridinepropionic acid (TPA) and mCPP (both via N-dealkylation of the piperazinyl nitrogen mediated by CYP3A4), and a metabolite formed by N-oxidation of the piperazinyl nitrogen. CYP1A2, CYP2D6, and CYP3A4 genotypes all do not seem to predict concentrations of trazodone or mCPP. In any case, there are large interindividual variations in the metabolism of trazodone. In addition, poor metabolizers of dextromethorphan, a CYP2D6 substrate, eliminate mCPP more slowly and have higher concentrations of mCPP than do extensive metabolizers.

mCPP is formed from trazodone by CYP3A4 and is metabolized via hydroxylation by CYP2D6 (to a para-hydroxylated metabolite). It may contribute to the pharmacological actions of trazodone. mCPP levels are only 10% of those of trazodone during therapy with trazodone, but is nonetheless present at concentrations known to produce psychic and physical effects in humans when mCPP has been administered alone. In any case, the actions of trazodone, such as its serotonin antagonism, might partially overwhelm those of mCPP. As a consequence of the production of mCPP as a metabolite, patients administered trazodone may test positive on EMIT II urine tests for the presence of MDMA ("ecstasy").

Elimination
The elimination of trazodone is biphasic: the first phase's half-life (distribution) is 3 to 6hours, and the following phase's half-life (elimination) is 4.1 to 14.6hours. The elimination half-life of extended-release trazodone is 9.1 to 13.2hours. The elimination half-life of mCPP is 2.6 to 16.0hours and is longer than that of trazodone. Metabolites are conjugated to gluconic acid or glutathione and around 70 to 75% of 14C-labelled trazodone was found to be excreted in the urine within 72hours. The remaining drug and its metabolites are excreted in the faeces via biliary elimination. Less than 1% of the drug is excreted in its unchanged form. After an oral dose of trazodone, it was found to be excreted 20% in the urine as TPA and conjugates, 9% as the dihydrodiol metabolite, and less than 1% as unconjugated mCPP. mCPP is glucuronidated and sulfated similarly to other trazodone metabolites.

Chemistry
Trazodone is a triazolopyridine derivative and a phenylpiperazine that is structurally related to nefazodone and etoperidone, each of which are derivatives of it. Flibanserin is an analogue of trazodone.

History
Trazodone was developed in Italy, in the 1960s, by Angelini Research Laboratories as a second-generation antidepressant. It was developed according to the mental pain hypothesis, which was postulated from studying patients and which proposes that major depression is associated with a decreased pain threshold. In sharp contrast to most other antidepressants available at the time of its development, trazodone showed minimal effects on muscarinic cholinergic receptors. Trazodone was patented and marketed in many countries all over the world. It was approved by the Food and Drug Administration (FDA) in 1981 and was the first non-tricyclic or MAOI antidepressant approved in the US.

Society and culture

Generic names

Brand names
Trazodone has been marketed under a large number of brand names throughout the world. Major brand names include Desyrel (worldwide), Donaren (Brazil), Molipaxin (Ireland, United Kingdom), Oleptro (United States), Trazorel (Canada), and Trittico (worldwide).

Research
Trazodone may be effective in the treatment of sexual dysfunction, for instance female sexual dysfunction and erectile dysfunction. A 2003 systematic review and meta-analysis found some indication that trazodone may be useful in the treatment of erectile dysfunction. Besides trazodone alone, a combination of trazodone and bupropion (developmental code names and tentative brand names S1P-104, S1P-205, Lorexys, and Orexa) is under development for the treatment of erectile dysfunction and female sexual dysfunction. As of September 2021, it is in phase 2 clinical trials for these indications. It has been in this stage of clinical development since at least February 2015.

Trazodone may be useful in the treatment of certain symptoms like sleep disturbances in alcohol withdrawal and recovery. However, reviews have recommended against use of trazodone for alcohol withdrawal due to inadequate evidence. Very limited evidence suggests that trazodone might be useful in the treatment of certain symptoms in cocaine use disorder. Trazodone has been reported to be effective in the treatment of sleep apnea. Cochrane reviews found that trazodone was not effective in the treatment of agitation in dementia. Another Cochrane review found that trazodone might be useful in the treatment of sleep disturbances in dementia. Further systematic reviews have found that trazodone may be effective for behavioral and psychological symptoms in dementias such as frontotemporal dementia and Alzheimer's disease.

Trazodone has been studied as an adjunctive therapy in the treatment of schizophrenia. It has been reported to decrease negative symptoms without worsening positive symptoms although improvement in negative symptoms was modest. Trazodone has also been reported to be effective in treating antipsychotic-related extrapyramidal symptoms such as akathisia. Trazodone has been studied and reported to be effective in the treatment of bulimia, but there is limited evidence to support this use. It might be useful in the treatment of night eating disorder as well. Trazodone might be effective in the treatment of adjustment disorder. It may also be effective in the treatment of bruxism in children and adolescents.

Trazodone may be useful in the treatment of certain chronic pain disorders. There is limited but conflicting evidence to support the use of trazodone in the treatment of headaches and migraines in children. Trazodone may be useful in the treatment of fibromyalgia as well as diabetic neuropathy. It may also be useful in the treatment of burning mouth syndrome. A 2004 narrative review claimed that trazodone could be used in the treatment of complex regional pain syndrome. Trazodone may also be effective in the treatment of functional gastrointestinal disorders. It may be effective in the treatment of non-cardiac chest pain as well.

Trazodone may be useful in promoting motor recovery after stroke.

Veterinary use
Trazodone has been used to reduce anxiety and stress, to improve sleep, and to produce sedation in dogs and cats in veterinary medicine.

References

External links

5-HT1A agonists
5-HT2A antagonists
Alpha-1 blockers
Antidepressants
Anxiolytics
H1 receptor antagonists
Hypnotics
2-(3-(4-(3-chlorophenyl)piperazin-1-yl)propyl)-1,2,4-triazol-3-ones
Serotonin reuptake inhibitors
Triazolopyridines
Ureas
Wikipedia medicine articles ready to translate